Uttar Pradesh State Highway 21 (UP SH 21) passes through Bilaraya - Lakhimpur - Sitapur - Panwari and covers a distance of 385.46 km.

Uttar Pradesh state in India has a series of road networks.

See also
 State highway
 State Highway (India)
 Lakhimpur Kheri district
 Dudhwa National Park

References

External links
 Lakhimpur Kheri official website
 State Highway 21 on Google Maps

State Highways in Uttar Pradesh